Ledgers Wood is a   nature reserve in Chelsham in Surrey. It is owned by Surrey County Council and managed by the Surrey Wildlife Trust.

This semi-natural wood is mainly oak, with other trees such as silver birch, ash, holly, Crataegus monogyna and sweet chestnut. Flowering plants include bluebell, lesser celandine and primrose.

There is access by a track from Church Lane.

References

Surrey Wildlife Trust